Charles McAlister (14 December 1891 – 16 January 1940) was a South African cricketer. He played in ten first-class matches for Border from 1920/21 to 1926/27.

See also
 List of Border representative cricketers

References

External links
 

1891 births
1940 deaths
South African cricketers
Border cricketers
Cricketers from East London, Eastern Cape